Hazardia is a genus of microsporidians that parasite insects, with the type host being Culex pipiens. It is currently classified as incertae sedis within the order Amblyosporida of phylum Rozellomycota.

Description
Hazardia is characterized by three sporulation sequences that occur primarily in the fat body of larval mosquitoes:
First sequence: small, oval binucleate spores are generated, and they encyst into sporonts.

Second sequence: diplokaryotic (i.e. with paired nuclei) sporonts divide through binary fission to produce lanceolate, thick-walled binucleate spores with a rugose exospore.

Third sequence: the most common sequence, it involves uninucleate sporonts that form sporogonial plasmodia that divide by multiple fission producing between 2 and 16 uninucleate spores (usually 8) that are pyriform and thin walled.

Ecology
The transmission of Hazardia between mosquitoes is per os, meaning through the mouth.

Taxonomy
There are two species:
 Hazardia milleri  (type species)
 Hazardia usbekistanica

References

Microsporidia genera